Methia brevis is a species of beetle in the family Cerambycidae. It was described by Fall in 1929.

References

Methiini
Beetles described in 1929